Jupiter 5 may refer to:

 Amalthea (moon), the moon of Jupiter, also called "Jupiter V"
 Jupiter Five (short story) story by Arthur C. Clarke
 Jupiter V (aeroplane), see Bristol Jupiter
 Jupiter-5, a model of music synthesizer of the Roland Jupiter

See also
 Jupiter (disambiguation)